Mariinsk (Otogol) is a rural locality (a selo) in Shebalinsky District, the Altai Republic, Russia. The population was 182 as of 2016. There are 2 streets.

Geography 
Mariinsk is located 107 km west of Shebalino (the district's administrative centre) by road. Ilyinka is the nearest rural locality.

References 

Rural localities in Shebalinsky District